McGinnis Hospital is a former hospital in Ligonier, Pennsylvania.  Founded by the Sisters of Mercy of Allegheny County, Pennsylvania in 1944 when they purchased the 1918 family mansion, the structure served as a hospital for the next 67 years and even included a pool.  It was the smallest hospital in Pennsylvania.  It was closed in 2011, with plans to open an 8-room hotel in the building in July 2013.

As of 2021,  McGinnis Hospital has been reformed into a company named Myriam's Table Café & Catering.

References

Hospitals in Pennsylvania
Buildings and structures in Westmoreland County, Pennsylvania
Houses completed in 1918
Defunct hospitals in Pennsylvania